Neganur  Village is a  village in Gingee taluk, Villupuram District in the India state of Tamil Nadu. The main activity is cultivating agricultural crops such as rice, groundnut, etc.

Location
People can take the 268,9 and Veerappa transport buses to reach the village, the maximum travel time will be 20 minutes from Gingee town.

Melkalavai (3 km), Perumpugai (3 km), Chellapiratti (3 km), Aviyur (4 km), Anangoor (4 km) are the nearby villages to Neganur. Neganur is surrounded by Gingee Block towards west, Melmalayanur Block towards west, Thellar Block towards North, Tindivanam Block towards East.

Tindivanam, Vandavasi, Viluppuram, Tiruvannamalai are the nearby cities to Neganur.	

This place is in the border of the Villupuram District and Tiruvannamalai District. Tiruvannamalai District Thellar is north towards this place.

Festival

Amman Temple:-

Neganur Village used to celebrate the Amman Temple festival every year mid of April and May months, it will celebrated one full day.

neganur pudur  village celebrate the poniyamman temple festival every years.

Gallery

History & Culture  

2,200-year-old Tamil-Brahmi inscription found on Neganur pudur.

Neganur Pudur main temples

Neganur pudur main temples:
 Ponniyamman temple
 Vinayagar temple
 Kannika parameshwari
 Venkateswara temple

Neganur 2011 Census Details

Neganur Local Language is Tamil. Neganur Village Total population is 3451 and number of houses are 895. Female Population is 48.5%. Village literacy rate is 65.4% and the Female Literacy rate is 26.8%.

Population

Census Parameter	Census Data

Total Population	3451

Total No of Houses	895

Female Population % 48.5% ( 1674)

Total Literacy rate % 65.4% ( 2258)

Female Literacy rate 26.8% ( 925)

Scheduled Tribes Population % 1.0% ( 36)

Scheduled Caste Population % 10.4% ( 360)

Working Population % 52.1%

Child(0 -6) Population by 2011	328

Girl Child(0 -6) Population % by 2011 47.9% ( 157)

Villages in Viluppuram district